Groninger is a Dutch language habitational surname for someone from Groningen. Notable people with the name include:
 James Groninger (1880–1944), American attorney, baseball player, manager, and league president
 Marcel Groninger (1970), Dutch former footballer

References 

Dutch-language surnames
Dutch toponymic surnames